Vicky Maes (born 07 May 1974) is a former Belgian tennis player and current tennis coach.

She has career-high WTA rankings of 307 in singles, achieved on 12 July 1993, and 348 in doubles, reached on 04 July1994. Maes won one singles and doubles titles on the ITF Circuit in her career.

She made her WTA Tour main-draw debut at the 1993 Brasil Tennis Cup.

Maes women's tennis coach of the Arizona Wildcats.

ITF Circuit finals

Singles: 1 (1–0)

Doubles: 1 (1–0)

References

External links 
 

1974 births
Living people
Belgian female tennis players
Arizona Wildcats women's tennis coaches
Belgian tennis coaches
20th-century Belgian women